Paraoxonase 3, also known as PON3, is a protein which in humans is encoded by the PON3 gene.

Function 

This gene is a member of the paraoxonase family and lies in a cluster on chromosome 7 with the other two family members. The encoded protein is secreted into the bloodstream and associates with high-density lipoprotein (HDL). The protein also rapidly hydrolyzes lactones and can inhibit the oxidation of low-density lipoprotein (LDL), a function that is believed to slow the initiation and progression of atherosclerosis. Alternatively spliced variants which encode different protein isoforms have been described; however, only one has been fully characterized.

References

Further reading